The Waikawau River is a river of the Waitomo District in the southern Waikato region.

See also
List of rivers of New Zealand

References

Waitomo District
Rivers of Waikato
Rivers of New Zealand